Max Wants a Divorce is a 1917 American short film directed by Max Linder.

Plot 
Max is forced to choose between losing his newly-wedded wife and a fortune. He hits upon a brilliant scheme: He will give his wife grounds for a divorce, secure the money, and then make his ex-wife Mrs. Linder again. He goes through any amount of trouble in helping her to get the necessary evidence, only to find that it is all a mistake on the part of a stupid lawyer - the money and the wife are both to be his. -- Edward Weitzel, Moving Picture World (April 7, 1917)

Cast 
Max Linder as Max
Martha Mansfield as Max's Wife (billed as Martha Early)
Helen Ferguson
Francine Larrimore
Ernest Maupain
Leo White
Mathilde Comont as the Loony Diva

Premiere and preservation status
The film premiered at the Strand Theatre in New York City on 26 March 1917. A restored print was presented by Serge Bromberg of Lobster Films at the San Francisco Silent Film Festival on 1 June 2014.

See also
List of rediscovered films

External links 

Max Wants a Divorce at SilentEra

Lantern-slide ad for the film

1917 films
1917 comedy films
1917 short films
American silent short films
1910s English-language films
American black-and-white films
Films directed by Max Linder
Silent American comedy films
Essanay Studios films
American comedy short films
1910s American films